Pieter Barbiers may refer to:

 Pieter Barbiers (painter) (1717–1780), Dutch  scenery artist
 Pieter Bartholomeusz Barbiers (1771–1837), Dutch painter
 Pieter Pietersz Barbiers (1749–1842), Dutch painter